The Saint Joseph the Worker Cathedral Parish, also known as San Jose Cathedral, is a Roman Catholic cathedral located at Barangay Rafael Rueda, Sr. Poblacion in the city of San Jose, Nueva Ecija, Philippines. It is the seat of the Roman Catholic Diocese of San Jose in Nueva Ecija and is dedicated to Saint Joseph the Worker.

History
The first missionaries in what is now the province of Nueva Ecija were the Augustinians who also founded the parishes of Carranglan, Pantabangan and Puncan, of which San Jose was initially part of. San Jose was originally known as Kabaritan which is an Ilocano term for a "place abundant of barit", a kind of rattan plant. It was a barrio of Puncan and then of Lupao, before becoming an independent town in 1894, and was renamed San Jose in honor of its patron saint, Joseph.

Until 1928, San Jose was under the jurisdiction of the Nueva Segovia before becoming part of the Diocese of Lingayen, later Lingayen–Dagupan, which was established in the same year. Under Lingayen–Dagupan, the church was administered by the Missionaries of the Sacred Heart after World War II. San Jose was then annexed to the Diocese of Cabanatuan when the diocese, then comprised the whole province of Nueva Ecija, was founded in 1963. Twenty-one years later, in 1984, the church became the cathedral of the Diocese of San Jose whose territory comprises the northern half of the province.

In 1997, the remodeling of the old cathedral church was started under then San Jose Bishop Leo Drona. It was finished in 2006 and was reconsecrated by then Lingayen–Dagupan Archbishop Oscar Cruz on March 20 of the same year. The reredos or retablo of the cathedral are works of Kapampangan artist Willy Layug, who also worked on the cathedrals of Dagupan, Bacolod, and Urdaneta.

Gallery

References

External links
 Facebook page 

San Jose, Nueva Ecija
Roman Catholic churches in Nueva Ecija
Roman Catholic cathedrals in the Philippines
20th-century Roman Catholic church buildings in the Philippines